Meloidogyne thamesi, the Thames' root-knot nematode, is a plant pathogenic nematode (roundworm) infecting tea.

See also 
 List of tea diseases

References 

Tylenchida
Agricultural pest nematodes
Tea diseases
Nematodes described in 1952